NS0 cells are a model cell line derived from the nonsecreting murine myeloma used in biomedical research and commercially in the production of therapeutic proteins. The cell line is a cholesterol-dependent cell line that was generated from a subline of NSI/1 which produced only the light chain but no heavy chain.

Cell line development
Development of murine neoplasms started with work with the BALB/c mice to isolate the IgG1 secreting MOPC21 tumor. From this tumor, the P3K cells were isolated and developed into two cell lines, 289-16 and P3-X63. The 289-16 cell line secreted only light chain and no heavy chain and was renamed NSI/1. Clones from that cell line were isolated and a nonsecreting cell line was identified and was named NS0/1.

Uses in biotechnology
As myeloma cells, NSo cells are naturally antibody-producing suspension cells with a lymphoblast morphology. Gene amplification is typically performed using GS-transfected NS0 cells to select for producing cell lines. The GS-NS0 is a heterologous mammalian expression system that allows for the rapid expression of recombinant proteins. Several therapeutic antibody products are produced using the NS0 cell line including daclizumab and eculizumab.

References

External links
Cellosaurus entry for NS0

Rodent cell lines